Peter A. Hemmy (March 22, 1875 – April 24, 1965) was a member of the Wisconsin State Assembly.

Biography
Hemmy was born in Honey Creek, Sauk County, Wisconsin. He attended high school in Prairie du Sac, Wisconsin, after which he was a schoolteacher and also played semi-professional baseball. He married Emma Zerbel in 1897. He lived in Humbird, Wisconsin from 1947 to 1964. He died in Mondovi, Wisconsin.

Career
Hemmy was a member of the Assembly twice: first from 1917 to 1918 and second from 1935 to 1940 as a member of the Wisconsin Progressive Party. Additionally, he was town clerk of Prairie du Sac, as well as town clerk, assessor and supervisor of Alma, Jackson County, Wisconsin and a member of the Jackson County, Wisconsin Board.

References

External links

The Political Graveyard

People from Honey Creek, Sauk County, Wisconsin
People from Clark County, Wisconsin
Members of the Wisconsin State Assembly
Wisconsin Progressives (1924)
20th-century American politicians
1875 births
1965 deaths
People from Jackson County, Wisconsin